Generalized lentiginosis is a cutaneous condition that will occasionally present without other associated abnormalities. It may be caused by carney complex, Noonan syndrome with multiple lentigines or Peutz–Jeghers syndrome.

See also 
 Lentigo
 Skin lesion

References

External links 

Melanocytic nevi and neoplasms